Lederhosen (singular in German usage: Lederhose) are short or knee-length leather breeches that are worn as traditional garments in some regions of German-speaking countries. The longer ones are generally called Bundhosen or Kniebundhosen. Once common workwear across Central Europe, these  clothes—or Tracht—are particularly associated with Bavaria and the Tyrol region.

Traditional Bavarian men's clothing

Formerly, lederhosen were worn for hard physical work; they were more durable than a fabric garment. Today, they are mostly worn as leisurewear. Lederhosen and dirndl attire is also common at Oktoberfest events around the world.

Lederhosen were widespread among men of the Alpine and surrounding regions, including Bavaria, Austria, the Allgäu, Switzerland, the autonomous Italian region of Trentino-Alto Adige/Südtirol (formerly part of Austria-Hungary) and the Alpine area of today's Slovenia. 

La Couturière Parisienne, however, says that lederhosen were originally not exclusively a Bavarian garment but were worn all over Europe, especially by riders, hunters, and other people involved in outdoor activities. The flap (drop front) may have been a unique  Bavarian invention. The drop-front style  became so popular in the 18th century that it was known in France as à la bavaroise, "in the Bavarian style."

The popularity of lederhosen in Bavaria dropped sharply in the 19th century. They began to be considered as uncultured peasants' clothing that was not fitting for modern city-dwellers. However, in the 1880s a resurgence set in, and several clubs were founded in Munich and other large cities devoted to preserving traditional rural clothing styles. The conception of lederhosen as a quintessentially Bavarian garment that is worn at festive occasions rather than at work dates largely from this time.

Lederhosen have remained regionally popular and are popularly associated with virility and brawn. Some men wear them when gardening, hiking, working outdoors, or attending folk festivals or beer gardens. They are a symbol of regional pride in Bavaria and the other areas where they are worn, but are rarely seen elsewhere.

Traditional lederhosen are hand made of tanned deer leather which makes the pants soft and light but very tearproof. As those leather pants are very valuable and can last a lifetime, some Bavarians even bequeath their lederhosen to the next generation. Some variations of modern lederhosen are made of heavier, lower quality leather, or imitations like velour leather which make them much cheaper but less durable. All variations are usually equipped with two side pockets, one hip pocket, one knife pocket, and a codpiece (drop front). For an Oktoberfest costume, people combine lederhosen with Haverlschuhe, stockings and a classic white or checked shirt.

Traditional Swabian men's clothing
Lederhosen are also part of the traditional costume of Swabia and its former portion of the Black Forest in present-day Baden-Württemberg. However, the lederhosen in these areas were always worn below the knee and never in the short style which is common in Bavaria. These knee-length bundhosen are cuffed at the bottom, also unlike their Bavarian counterparts. While plaid shirts were worn with Swabian lederhosen at times, they are historically more commonly worn with a white linen shirt and colorful vest, most commonly red. Also unique to the region is the color of the lederhosen. In contrast to brown, most Swabians, including farmers, would wear black, while the region's winemakers wore yellow. These lederhosen also have a decorative motif that is unique to the region. Today, lederhosen and so-called traditional costumes are worn mainly for local festivals and partially designed according to modern fashion trends.

Traditional German boys' clothing 

German boys used to wear lederhosen up to the age of about sixteen years. These lederhosen were not decorated with embroidery, and had the typical suspenders/braces and drop-front flap. Even today, some German and French Scouts wear various forms of lederhosen, although in most cases they are not part of their official uniform.

Lederhosen were also worn by Austrian boys from the 1930s to the 1970s. Today they are worn on special occasions, such as a Biergarten or Zeltfest. Girls wear the Dirndl, which is part of Southern German and Austrian Tracht.

See also
Austrian folk dancing
National costume
Schuhplattler
Tracht
Trousers

References

External links

Austrian clothing
Culture of South Tyrol
Culture of Altbayern
Folk costumes
German clothing
Italian clothing
Leather clothing
Swiss clothing
Trousers and shorts